Opinion polling for the 2015 Croatian parliamentary election started immediately after the 2011 general election. Monthly party ratings are conducted by Ipsos Puls, Mediana and Promocija Plus.

The poll results below are listed by category and ordered in reverse chronological order. Major political events are indicated chronologically between individual polls.

Opinion polling

Exit polls

Graphical summary

If the Elections Were Held Today?

Seats projections (76 needed for majority)

2014

2013

2012

2011

References

Elections in Croatia
Croatia
Opinion polling in Croatia